Promenesta is a moth genus of the family Depressariidae. It is endemic to South America.

Species
 Promenesta autampyx Meyrick, 1925
 Promenesta callichlora Meyrick, 1915
 Promenesta capnocoma (Meyrick, 1931)
 Promenesta chrysampyx Meyrick, 1915
 Promenesta haplodoxa Meyrick, 1925
 Promenesta isotrocha Meyrick, 1918
 Promenesta leucomias Meyrick, 1925
 Promenesta lithochroma Busck, 1914
 Promenesta marginella Busck, 1914
 Promenesta solella (Walker, 1864)
 Promenesta triacmopa (Meyrick, 1931)

References

 
Stenomatinae